= South West African Labour and Farmers' Party =

Namibian party

The South West African Labour and Farmers' Party was a political party in Namibia. It was founded on 25 November 1931.
